Charles H. Foy (1809 – 30 May 1866) was a sailor in the U.S. Navy during the American Civil War. He received the Medal of Honor for his actions during the Second Battle of Fort Fisher on January 15, 1865.

Military service
Despite being in his early 50s, Foy joined the Navy from Boston in July 1861, and was assigned to the Union steamer . 

On January 15, 1865, the North Carolina Confederate stronghold of Fort Fisher was taken by a combined Union storming party of sailors, marines, and soldiers under the command of Admiral David Dixon Porter and General Alfred Terry.

Medal of Honor citation
The President of the United States of America, in the name of Congress, takes pleasure in presenting the Medal of Honor to Signal Quartermaster Charles H. Foy, United States Navy, for extraordinary heroism in action while serving on board the U.S.S. Rhode Island during the action with Fort Fisher and the Federal Point batteries, North Carolina, 13 to 15 January 1865. Carrying out his duties courageously during the battle, Signal Quartermaster Foy continued to be outstanding by his good conduct and faithful services throughout this engagement which resulted in a heavy casualty list when an attempt was made to storm Fort Fisher.

General Orders: War Department, General Orders No. 59 (June 22, 1865)

Action Date: January 15, 1865

Service: Navy

Rank: Signal Quartermaster

Division: U.S.S. Rhode Island

See also

List of Medal of Honor recipients
List of American Civil War Medal of Honor recipients: A–F

References

1809 births
Year of death missing
Union Navy sailors
United States Navy Medal of Honor recipients
People from Portsmouth, New Hampshire
American Civil War recipients of the Medal of Honor